Sheila Kelley may refer to:

Sheila Kelley (American actress), American television actress, played Gwen Taylor in L.A. Law
Sheila Kelley (British actress), British television actress